"My Tears Ricochet" (stylized in all lowercase) is a song written and recorded by American singer-songwriter Taylor Swift. It is the fifth track on Swift's eighth studio album, Folklore (2020), which was released on July 24, 2020, through Republic Records. The track was produced by Swift, Jack Antonoff and Joe Alwyn.

Incorporating choir-inflected layered vocals, mellow synths and shuddering drums, "My Tears Ricochet" has been described as a "haunting" tune that blends rock, goth, arena rock and gospel music. Its lyrics are a narration by the ghost of a dead woman, which finds its murderer, who she once loved dearly, at its own funeral. This dynamic is a metaphor for Swift's feelings of resentment and betrayal towards her former record label's founder, Scott Borchetta, who sold the masters of her back catalog to Scooter Braun.

Critics received "My Tears Ricochet" with rave reviews, praising the song's concept, imagery, emotion, vocals and production. Upon Folklores release, "My Tears Ricochet" debuted inside the top 10 of the singles charts in Australia, Malaysia and Singapore, and in the top 20 of the Canadian Hot 100 and the U.S. Billboard Hot 100. The song was included on the set list of the Eras Tour (2023).

Background and release
"My Tears Ricochet" was the first track written for the album, penned by Swift alone. Album co-producer Aaron Dessner regarded the song as a "beacon" for the record. In an interview with Entertainment Weekly, Swift said that, following the sale of her master recordings to Scooter Braun, narratives around divorce had been triggering her, and she incorporated imagery of the end of marriage into "My Tears Ricochet", writing the first lines of the song after watching the 2019 film Marriage Story, which tells the story of a divorce.

Swift announced her eighth studio album, Folklore, on July 23, 2020. She revealed the track-list, where "My Tears Ricochet" placed fifth. In the primer that preceded the release, Swift described "My Tears Ricochet" as imageries of "an embittered tormentor showing up at the funeral of his fallen object of obsession" and "battleships sinking down into the ocean, down, down, down".

Composition and lyrics 
"My Tears Ricochet" is an icy arena-goth, album-oriented rock, and gospel ballad with hints of synth-pop, about the specter of a dead woman haunting her murderer. The track subsequently utilized funereal symbolism to depict the effect of total betrayal. The song sees Swift's vocals range from C3 to F5, and was written in a C major key with a moderate tempo of 130 beats per minute. It encompasses a twinkling music box, backing choir, reverbed ad-libs in the bridge, and reaches a tumultuous climax over shuddering drums. Backing vocals on the track are provided by producer Jack Antonoff.

Lyrically, "My Tears Ricochet" sees the narrator question their deservation of their mistreatment, and admit that she chose not to "go with grace" by haunting the memorial. The song enquires why the former lover chose to attend her funeral despite "cursing [her] name" and compares their deorientated relationship to sunken battleships in the sea. The song's lyrics and symbolisms reference Swift's masters controversy, and the bitter ending of her ties with the founder of Big Machine, Scott Borchetta. Apart from the overaching funereal motif, Swift uses the imagery of battleships sinking into an ocean, to draw a dramatic picture of how it feels to make one wrong move and lose something enormous.

Critical reception
"My Tears Ricochet" received critical acclaim from music critics, praising the song's concept, lyrics, imagery, emotion, Swift's vocals and production. Writing for NME, Hannah Mylrea drew comparisons between "My Tears Ricochet" and "Clean" from Swift's record 1989, remarking that "a megawatt pop song is encased in layered vocals and twinkling music box instrumentals". Jody Rosen of the Los Angeles Times said in a review that the track built up to "a tumultuous climax", and that the track was "goth, like Chartres Cathedral is goth". Billboard Jason Lipshutz wrote that the song "builds into a sorrowful anthem", and that "a bitter parting becomes a literal death". In a piece for Slant Magazine, Eric Mason named this track "one of Folklore’s most straightforwardly resentful stories", saying that "the sharp beats of strings on the chorus recall the bridges of early-2010s Swift songs", comparing it with "Mad Woman" and "Cruel Summer". Ann Powers of NPR deemed the song "more sophisticated" than Swift's previous writing while remaining "classic Taylor Swift", and stated that the singer takes an event "specific almost only to her, and opens it up into something universal ... because we have all experienced a sense of betrayal and loss of self-ownership." Lucy Harbron of Clash wrote "My Tears Ricochet" is one of Swift's most "gut-wrenching" songs; she said the track "turns into a funeral lament that perfectly vocalises all the sadness and anger and displacement that comes with a mega heartbreak."

Commercial performance 
Driven by Folklore release, "My Tears Ricochet" opened at number 16 on the US Billboard Hot 100, amongst the album's 10 tracks to chart inside the top 40 and five to enter the top 20; it charted for two weeks before its exit. The song further reached number 3 on the Hot Rock & Alternative Songs chart. It also reached number 7 on the Singaporean and Malayasian singles charts, number 8 on Australia's ARIA Singles Chart, and number 14 on the Canadian Hot 100.

Credits and personnel
Credits adapted from Tidal.

 Taylor Swift – vocals, songwriting, production
 Jack Antonoff – backing vocals, production, recording, live drums, percussion, programming, electric guitars, keyboards, piano, bass
 Joe Alwyn – production
 Laura Sisk – recording
 John Rooney – assistant engineering
 Jon Sher – assistant engineering
 Serban Ghenea – mixing
 Randy Merrill – mastering
 Evan Smith – saxophones, keyboard, programming
 Bobby Hawk – strings

Charts

Weekly charts

Year-end charts

Certification

References

2020s ballads
2020 songs
Song recordings produced by Jack Antonoff
Song recordings produced by Taylor Swift
Songs written by Taylor Swift
Taylor Swift songs
American rock songs
Gothic rock songs
Gospel songs
Rock ballads
Song recordings produced by Joe Alwyn